Igor Stepanov (born August 3, 1970) is a Soviet and a Russian former professional ice hockey forward. He is a one-time Russian Champion

Awards and honors

References

External links
Biographical information and career statistics from Eliteprospects.com, or The Internet Hockey Database

1970 births
Living people
Kristall Saratov players
HC Neman Grodno players
Ak Bars Kazan players
Russian ice hockey forwards